The Turkvision Song Contest is a song contest held amongst countries and regions with a large Turkic population. Songs must be performed in a Turkic language, but a few have combined Turkic languages with other national languages. 's entries have been in both Albanian (an Indo-European language) and Turkish.

Languages

Winners by language

See also 
 List of languages in the Eurovision Song Contest
 List of languages in the Junior Eurovision Song Contest

Languages
Turkvision